Dilo is standard Spanish for "say it". It may also refer to:

People
 Christopher Dilo (born 1994), French footballer
 Dilo Doxan (born 1984), Kurdish Syrian musician

Places
 Dilo, Bourgogne-Franche-Comté, France, former commune now part of Arces-Dilo
 Dilo River, Gabon

Other
 Dilo oil tree, also known as Calophyllum inophyllum

See also
 Day in the life of (disambiguation)